Complexul Sportiv Steaua, also known as Complexul Sportiv Ghencea, is a sports complex in Bucharest, Romania. It is currently used mostly for football, rugby, water polo and tennis  matches, as well as for fencing, gymnastics and swimming competitions. The complex was built between 1948 and 1970s by the Ministry of National Defence, which is also the current owner of the complex. The main operator is CSA Steaua București, sports club managed by the same institution.

Facilities
 Stadionul Steaua (2021)
 capacity of 31,254 seats
 used for football and some rugby matches
 home ground of CSA Steaua București (football)
 home ground of the Romania national football team for various matches

Stadionul Steaua (1974)
 opened on 9 April 1974
 capacity of 28,365 seats
 used for football and some rugby matches
 home ground of CSA Steaua București (football) between 1974 and 2003
 home ground of FCSB between 2003 and 2015
 home ground of the Romania national team for various matches
 demolished in 2018

 Stadionul Steaua 5
 capacity of 1,528 seats
 used for football
 home ground of CSA Steaua București (football)
 surrounded by other 2 grass pitches and 1 with an artificial turf

 Stadionul Steaua (rugby)
 opened in 1948
 capacity of 2,000 people (1,200 seated)
 used for rugby matches
 home ground of CSA Steaua București (rugby)

 Stadionul Steaua 2 (rugby)
 opened in 1948
 capacity of 200 seats
 used for rugby matches and trainings
 training ground of CSA Steaua București (rugby)

 Steaua Fencing Hall
 Steaua Gymnastics Hall
 Steaua Tennis Complex (14 outdoor and 1 indoor grounds)
 Steaua Semi-Olympic Pool

References

External links
Complexul Sportiv Steaua at soccerway.com

CSA Steaua București
Football venues in Romania
Rugby union stadiums in Romania
Sport in Bucharest
Buildings and structures in Bucharest